This is a list of Namibian regions by Human Development Index as of 2021.

Note: the HDI values are calculated using the pre-2013 regional borders, so the Kavango Region is included in the data which represents the current Kavango East and Kavango West regions.

References 

Namibia
Human Development Index
Regions by Human Development Index